Lisvel Elisa Eve-Castillo (née Eve Mejía, born September 10, 1991 in Puerto Plata) is a female volleyball player from the Dominican Republic, who played for the Women's National Team at the 2012 Summer Olympics.

She also played the 2008 Olympic Qualification Tournament in Japan. There the team ended up in fourth place, and did not qualify for the 2008 Summer Olympics. Shortly afterwards Eve claimed the gold medal at the 2008 Women's Pan-American Volleyball Cup in Mexico as a sixteen-year-old.

Personal life
She was born on September 10, 1991 in Puerto Plata. She was recruited by the former National Team member Miriam García.
Eve is married to the professional baseball player Damian Ismael Defrank Campusano, who played for the Arizona Diamondbacks.

Career
Eve was the youngest athlete during the 2007 FIVB Women's World Cup, there she ranked 9th with her national team. She was chosen 2008 Athlete of the Year of her native province of Puerto Plata by the Guild of Sport Writers.

Playing in Puerto Rico at the Liga de Voleibol Superior Femenino with Criollas de Caguas for the 2009 season, she was chosen among the "All-Star" Team, and also at the "Offensive Team".

Playing in Chiapas, Mexico with her National Senior Team she won the 2010 Final Four Cup gold medal. She signed for the Japanese professional club Denso Airybees for the 2010-2011 season.

At the 2011 Pan-American Cup, Eve was awarded with the Best Server award, also winning the silver medal with her national team. For the 2012 Season of the Puerto Rican League, Eve signed for the team Criollas de Caguas.

At the 2012 Olympic Games held in London, Eve played with her National Team ranking in the 5th place after losing the quarter final game to the United States.

Eve signed for the Brazilian professional club Banana Boat/Praia Clube for the 2012/2013 season. Even when she was announced, her Brazilian team presented the American Danielle Scott and instead of playing in Brazil, she was signed by the Peruvian professional club Deportivo Géminis for a three months contract.

In September 2012, Eve won the gold medal at the first 2012 U23 Pan-American Cup, played in Callao, Peru.

2013 Injury
During the 2012/2013 Peruvian League, Eve suffered an exposed tibia and fibula fracture in her left leg on February 16, 2013. She went under surgery for surgical cleaning.

Clubs
 Deportivo Nacional (2004–2005)
 Mirador (2006–2007)
 Santiago (2008)
 Criollas de Caguas (2009)
 GS Caltex (2009–2010)
 Indias de Mayagüez (2010)
 Denso Airybees (2010–2011)
 Criollas de Caguas (2012)
 Deportivo Géminis (2012-2013)
 Deportivo Géminis (2015-2019)
 Universidad de San Martín de Porres (2019-2020)

Awards

Individuals
 2008 NORCECA Junior Continental Championship U-20 "Best Attacker"
 2008 Dominican Volleyball League "Best Blocker"
 2008 Dominican Volleyball League "Best Scorer"
 2009 Liga de Voleibol Superior Femenino "All-Star"
 2009 Liga de Voleibol Superior Femenino "Offensive Team"
 2010 Pan-American Cup "Best Blocker"
 2011 Pan-American Cup "Best Server"
 2015 NORCECA Champions Cup "Most Valuable Player"
 2019 Pan American Games "Best Middle Blockers"

Junior Team
 2006 NORCECA Girls Youth Continental Championship U-18  Silver Medal
 2008 NORCECA Women´s Junior Continental Championship U-20  Silver Medal
 2009 FIVB U20 Volleyball World Championship  Silver Medal
 2012 U23 Pan-American Cup -  Gold Medal

Clubs
 2008 Dominican Republic Volleyball League -  3rd Place, with Santiago
 2010 Empress's Cup -  Champion, with Denso Airybees

References

External links
 FIVB Profile
 Norceca News

1991 births
Living people
Dominican Republic women's volleyball players
Volleyball players at the 2012 Summer Olympics
Olympic volleyball players of the Dominican Republic
Central American and Caribbean Games gold medalists for the Dominican Republic
Competitors at the 2010 Central American and Caribbean Games
Middle blockers
Opposite hitters
Outside hitters
Expatriate volleyball players in the United States
Expatriate volleyball players in South Korea
Expatriate volleyball players in Japan
Expatriate volleyball players in Peru
Dominican Republic expatriate sportspeople in Japan
Dominican Republic expatriate sportspeople in the United States
Dominican Republic expatriate sportspeople in South Korea
Dominican Republic expatriates in Peru
Pan American Games medalists in volleyball
Pan American Games gold medalists for the Dominican Republic
Volleyball players at the 2019 Pan American Games
Central American and Caribbean Games medalists in volleyball
Medalists at the 2019 Pan American Games
Volleyball players at the 2020 Summer Olympics